Shooting at the 1960 Summer Olympics in Rome comprised six events, all for men only. They were held between 3 and 10 September 1960.

Medal summary

Participating nations
A total of 313 shooters from 59 nations competed at the Rome Games:

Medal table

References

External links
Official Olympic Report

 
1960 Summer Olympics events
1960
Olympics
Shooting competitions in Italy